China competed in the 1994 Asian Games which were held in Hiroshima, Japan from October 2, 1994 to October 16, 1994.

See also
 China at the Asian Games
 China at the Olympics
 Sport in China

Nations at the 1994 Asian Games
1994
Asian Games